Central Tilba and Tilba Tilba are two villages near the Princes Highway in Eurobodalla Shire, New South Wales, Australia.

History
The area was originally inhabited by the Yuin people, an Aboriginal nation. Tilba Tilba is the original name of the district, and is said to mean "many waters" in the Thawa language.

The town was settled during the Australian gold rushes of the nineteenth century, and was the home town of the Bate family, of political renown.

Location and description
The entire village is classified by the National Trust as the Central Tilba Conservation Area.

Attractions
The ABC Cheese Factory in Central Tilba was in operation from September 1891 until 2006 and it remains a local attraction. The Tilba Factory was purchased in 2012 by two local dairy farmers who installed new cheese-making and milk-bottling equipment, bringing back the tradition of dairy manufacture to the Tilba area. The milk bottled and cheese made on site are from two local dairy farms, one in Tilba one in Cobargo. In 2006 there were 19 locals employed at the Tilba Factory, where they were producing award-winning cheese, yoghurt, milk and cream made from jersey milk.  the business is called Tilba Real Dairy.

Gulaga / Mount Dromedary, an extinct volcano which created the geological composition of the area, including the nearby Najanuka / Little Dromedary Mountain to the south, rises above Central Tilba.

In media
It is the site for the television series: River Cottage Australia.

See also 
 List of reduplicated Australian place names

References

External links 
 Collection of photographs including some taken by William Henry Corkhill 1846-1936 held in Pictures Collection National Library Australia

Towns in New South Wales
Towns in the South Coast (New South Wales)
Eurobodalla Shire